Paullo (locally  ) is a  (municipality) in the Metropolitan City of Milan in the Italian region Lombardy, located about  southeast of Milan.

Paullo borders the following municipalities: Mediglia, Merlino, Mulazzano, Settala, Tribiano, Zelo Buon Persico. It received the honorary title of city with a presidential decree on April 2, 2009.

A projected extension of Milan Metro line 3 to Paullo is currently on hold, awaiting funding.

Demographic evolution

References

Cities and towns in Lombardy

 Pauliaus Dabašinsko miestas